James Kimbrell (born 1967) is an American poet.

Life
As an undergraduate he majored in philosophy at Millsaps College, where his poetry was first published in the literary magazine Stylus.

He graduated from the University of Southern Mississippi with an M.A., from University of Virginia with an MFA, and from University of Missouri in Columbia, Missouri with a Ph.D.  He teaches at Florida State University.

His work has appeared in Poetry, Field, Fence, The Nation, Prairie Schooner, The Boston Book Review.

Awards

 1998 Whiting Award
 Ruth Lilly Fellowship
 "Discovery"/The Nation Award
 Ford Foundation Fellowship
 Academy of American Poets Prize
 National Endowment for the Arts Individual Artist Fellowship, Creative Writing-2005
 2016 John Simon Guggenheim Fellow
 National Endowment for the Arts Individual Artist Fellowship, Creative Writing-2017

Works

Books

Translations

Anthologies

References

External links
Profile at The Whiting Foundation
"Reviews: My Psychic by James Kimbrell", cold front

Living people
American male poets
University of Southern Mississippi alumni
University of Virginia alumni
University of Missouri alumni
Florida State University faculty
Korean–English translators
1967 births
21st-century American poets
21st-century translators
21st-century American male writers